CASC or Casc may refer to:

 CADE ATP System Competition
 California Association of Student Councils
 Cambodian Acid Survivors Charity
 Canadian Army Service Corps, redesignated as the Royal Canadian Army Service Corps
 Canadian Automobile Sport Clubs
 Cardington Artificial Slalom Course
 Carl Albert State College
 Centre for Advanced Structural Ceramics
 Certificate Authority Security Council
 China Aerospace Science and Technology Corporation
 China Aviation Supplies Import and Export Group Corporation, also known as CASC Group
 Community amateur sports club - a UK tax status
 Corps Area Service Command - a parts of the Corps area organization of the U.S. army from 1920-1942

See also 
 KASC (disambiguation)
 Casque (disambiguation)
 Cask (disambiguation)
 Kask (disambiguation)